Snelling Avenue is a light rail station along the Metro Green Line in Saint Paul, Minnesota. It is located along University Avenue on either side of the intersection with Snelling Avenue. The station has split side platforms, with the westbound platform on the north side of the tracks west of Snelling and the eastbound platform on the south side of the tracks east of the intersection.

This station serves the Snelling and University Avenues intersection. The Minnesota Department of Transportation counts 48,550 average daily motor vehicle volume, which is not in the 25 most-trafficked intersections in Minnesota. But urban historian Larry Millett calculated around 64,000 daily cars; he believes that Snelling and University is the busiest in the state.

Construction in this area began in 2011. The station opened along with the rest of the line in 2014.

Allianz Field opened in 2019 on the southeast corner of University and Snelling Avenues. The Snelling Avenue light rail station serves the new soccer stadium. Other notable features near the station include Ax-Man Surplus and the Turf Club.

Snelling & University station
Snelling & University is the name for the bus rapid transit station on the Metro A Line. Both station platforms are located south of University Avenue, providing convenient connections to the Green Line. The station midway between its route from 46th Street and Rosedale Transit Center. The station opened June 11, 2016 with the rest of the A Line. On system maps, the light rail station and rapid bus station are known collectively as just Snelling Avenue Station.

Bus connections
 Route 16 - University Avenue - Midway
 Route 21 - Uptown - Lake Street - Midway - Selby Avenue
 Route 84 - Snelling Avenue - Highland Village - Sibley Plaza
Connections to local bus Route 16 can be made on University Avenue. Connections to Routes 21 and 84 can be made at nearby stops on Snelling Avenue.

References

External links
Metro Transit: Snelling Avenue Station
Metro Transit: Snelling & University Station

Metro Green Line (Minnesota) stations in Saint Paul, Minnesota
Railway stations in the United States opened in 2014
2014 establishments in Minnesota
Bus stations in Minnesota